Orthorisma is a genus of moths in the family Geometridae described by Prout in 1912. It consists of only one species, Orthorisma netunaria, first described by Achille Guenée in 1858. It is found in Brunei, Malaysia (Sabah, Sarawak) and Indonesia (Kalimantan, Natuna Islands, Sumatra).

References

External links

Pseudoterpnini
Geometridae genera
Monotypic moth genera
Moths described in 1912
Moths of Asia